Ahmad Tafazzoli (December 16, 1937, Isfahan – January 15, 1997, Tehran) was a prominent Iranian Iranist and professor of ancient Iranian languages and culture at Tehran University.

One of his most important books is Pre-Islamic Persian Literature. Jaleh Amouzegar contributed in editing it.

In January 1997, Ahmad Tafazzoli was found dead in Punak, a suburb northwest of Tehran. He was known to have contacts with Iranian academics working abroad, and many of his colleagues believed that the authorities were behind his death, as part of the chain murders of Iran. While the precise circumstances remained unclear, Tafazzoli's death created a climate of fear at the university and discouraged criticism of the government.

See also
List of unsolved murders
Persian literature

Other notable Iranologists:
 Abdolhossein Zarrinkoub
 Alireza Shapour Shahbazi
 Richard Nelson Frye
 Ehsan Yarshater
 Mehrdad Bahar

References

Further reading
 The Spirit of Wisdom: Menog I Xrad : Essays in Memory of Ahmad Tafazzoli

External links
 Names of 47 victims of political killings in Iran sent to UN Human Rights High Commissioner

1937 births
1997 deaths
20th-century linguists
Burials at artist's block of Behesht-e Zahra
Iranian critics
Iranian Iranologists
Iranian murder victims
Writers from Isfahan
Linguists from Iran
Male murder victims
Members of the Academy of Persian Language and Literature
People murdered in Iran
Academic staff of the University of Tehran
Unsolved murders in Iran